These are the official results of the Men's 110 metres hurdles event at the 1990 European Championships in Split, Yugoslavia, held at Stadion Poljud on 30 and 31 August 1990.

Medalists

Results

Final
30 August
Wind: 2.0 m/s

Semi-finals
30 August

Semi-final 1
Wind: 0 m/s

Semi-final 2
Wind: 0 m/s

Heats
30 August

Heat 1
Wind: -0.8 m/s

Heat 2
Wind: -0.9 m/s

Heat 3
Wind: -1.2 m/s

Heat 4
Wind: -1 m/s

Participation
According to an unofficial count, 28 athletes from 17 countries participated in the event.

 (1)
 (1)
 (2)
 (3)
 (1)
 (1)
 (3)
 (1)
 (1)
 (1)
 (3)
 (1)
 (1)
 (1)
 (3)
 (3)
 (1)

See also
 1988 Men's Olympic 110m Hurdles (Seoul)
 1991 Men's World Championships 110m Hurdles (Tokyo)
 1992 Men's Olympic 110m Hurdles (Barcelona)

References

 Results

Hurdles 110
Sprint hurdles at the European Athletics Championships